WKFX (99.1 FM, "99.1 The Fox") is a radio station  broadcasting a classic hits music format. Licensed to Rice Lake, Wisconsin, United States, the station serves the Rice Lake-Spooner area.  The station is currently owned by TKC, Inc.

Current DJs include Arnie Wheeler, Michael J and Jenny Polzin.

References

External links

KFX
Classic hits radio stations in the United States
Barron County, Wisconsin
Radio stations established in 1980